Eetu Laurikainen (born February 1, 1993) is a Finnish professional ice hockey goaltender. He is currently playing with Lausanne HC in the Swiss National League (NL).

Playing career
Laurikainen made his Liiga debut playing with Espoo Blues during the 2014–15 Liiga season. On May 12, 2015, Laurikainen signed a two-year, entry-level contract with the Edmonton Oilers.

In his two seasons within the Oilers organization, Laurikainen was unable to make an impact, appearing in just 18 games with secondary affiliate, the Bakersfield Condors of the American Hockey League. After spending the entirety of the 2016–17 season with the Norfolk Admirals of the ECHL, Laurikainen opted to return to his native Finland in agreeing to a two-year contract with JYP of the Liiga on June 12, 2017.

References

External links

1993 births
Living people
Bakersfield Condors players
Espoo Blues players
Finnish ice hockey goaltenders
HPK players
JYP Jyväskylä players
Lausanne HC players
Norfolk Admirals (ECHL) players
Sportspeople from Jyväskylä
Swift Current Broncos players
21st-century Finnish people